The Gordon Sisters Boxing is an American short black-and-white silent film directed by Thomas A. Edison. It is one of the earliest female boxing movies. Edison’s film catalogue describes the film as follows: “Champion lady boxers of the world. Here we depict two female pugilists that are really clever. They are engaged in a hot and heavy one-round sparring exhibition, which is photographed against a very pleasing background, consisting of a park, with marble entrance and walk, and beautiful trees and shrubbery. The exhibition is very lively from start to finish; the blows fall thick and fast, and some very clever pugilistic generalship is exhibited.”

In an analysis of boxing in the context of modernism, Irene Gammel argues that the scene’s “symmetry and beauty [gesture] towards the artfulness of boxing as a cultivated sport.” In addition, she argues that the women’s choreographed movement shows “their boldly modern female physicality and sportsmanship.”

Cast

References

External links 
 

1901 films
American silent short films
American black-and-white films
Thomas Edison
American boxing films
Articles containing video clips
1900s sports films
1901 short films
1900s American films
Silent sports films
1900s English-language films